Taunton Deane is a constituency in Somerset represented in the House of Commons of the UK Parliament by Rebecca Pow of the Conservative Party since 2015.

History
Parliament accepted the Boundary Commission's Fifth Periodic Review of Westminster constituencies which created this constituency for the General Election 2010 as a reduced form of the Taunton seat.  The western wards, transferred to the new seat of Bridgwater and West Somerset for 2010, were all close to or in Exmoor, which were five in number:
Aville Vale, Brompton Ralph and Haddon, Dulverton and Brushford, Exmoor and, Qualme.

Political history
The predecessor seat, while approximately 7% larger in electorate (and thus due to population and settlements' growth, oversized), had been held by a Liberal Democrat, Jeremy Browne, since 2005, who won Taunton Deane as its main successor with a relatively marginal majority. In the two previous elections, the seat had seen alternation between Conservative and a Liberal Democrat control. The Taunton Deane seat was won by the Conservatives in the 2015 general election with a large majority.

The last general election in which either party polled less than 38% of the vote, thus allowing a larger majority, was in 1987, taking into account only one of their notionally equivalent predecessors, the Social Democratic Party - their candidate participated in the SDP–Liberal Alliance.

Prominent members
Between 2010 and 2015, the seat was represented by Jeremy Browne, who served in the Coalition government as a Minister of State in the Foreign and Commonwealth Office and the Home Office.

Boundaries

The seat has electoral wards:
Bishop's Hull, Bishops Lydeard, Blackdown, Bradford on Tone, Comeytrowe, Milverton and North Deane, Monument, Neroche, North Curry, Norton Fitzwarren, Ruishton and Creech, Staplegrove, Stoke St Gregory, Taunton: Blackbrook and Holway, Eastgate, Fairwater, Halcon, Killams and Mountfield, Lyngford, Manor and Wilton, Pyrland and Rowbarton wards, Trull, Wellington: East, North, Rockwell Green and West wards, West Monkton, Wiveliscombe and West Deane forming the Borough of Taunton Deane

This borough centres on the town of Taunton while extending to include Wellington within an approximate rhombus-shaped swathe of land forming the south-western portion of Somerset. The constituency covers a large part of the Devon—Somerset border.

History
In the 2005 general election, the victorious Liberal Democrats' candidate in Taunton required the smallest percentage swing from the Conservative MP for them to take the seat. In the 2010 general election, the seat was identified as a target for the Conservative Party, ranking 29th on their target list.  The incumbent, Jeremy Browne had a notional 3.3% lead from the 2005 election. Browne held the seat in 2010, increasing his majority to 6.9%, a 1.8% swing from the Conservatives to the Liberal Democrats.

Constituency profile
The seat is a mixture of partially agricultural commuter villages and a spacious urban town, which has business parks in a similar way to Wells, connected by road and rail to the major conurbations, north and south, Bristol and Exeter.  The majority of the eastern half of the ridge-like Blackdown Hills is in the Blackdown electoral ward.  Workless claimants, registered jobseekers,  were in November 2012 lower than the national average of 3.8%, at 2.6% of the population based on a statistical compilation by The Guardian.

Members of Parliament

2010–present

Elections

Elections in the 2010s

See also
 List of parliamentary constituencies in Somerset

Notes

References

Sources
 UK Constituency Maps
 BBC Vote 2001
 BBC Election 2005

Parliamentary constituencies in Somerset
Constituencies of the Parliament of the United Kingdom established in 2010
Taunton Deane
Taunton